James Akins may refer to:

 James E. Akins (1926–2010), U.S. Ambassador to Saudi Arabia
 James Akins (tubist), American tubist and music professor